Más madera is the second studio album by the Spanish hard rock band Leño. It was recorded in March 1980, produced and arranged by Teddy Bautista and published by Chapa Discos that same year.
The Spanish magazine Efe Eme ranked Más madera as the 142nd best Spanish rock album ever.

Track listing 
All songs written by Rosendo Mercado, Chiqui Mariscal and Ramiro Penas

Personnel 
Leño
 Rosendo Mercado: Guitar and vocals
 Ramiro Penas: Drums and backing vocals
 Tony Urbano: Bass guitar and backing vocals
Additional personnel
 Teddy Bautista: Keyboards
 Manolo Morales: Saxophone
 Luz Casal: Backing vocals
 Jaime Asúa: Backing vocals

References

External links 
 http://www.rosendo.es/

1980 albums
Spanish-language albums